Markkula is a Finnish surname, and it may refer to:

 Mike Markkula (born 1942), American entrepreneur and Apple CEO
 Mikko Markkula (1942–2012), Finnish chairman of the FIDE Qualification Commission
 Niko Markkula (born 1990), Finnish footballer 
 Tuomas Markkula (born 1990), Finnish footballer